Protogynanisa athletoides is a species of moth in the family Saturniidae. It was described by Rougeot in 1971. It is found in Tanzania and Malawi.

References

Moths described in 1971
Saturniinae